The 2015 CONCACAF U-17 Championship was a scheduled age-restricted international association football tournament organised by CONCACAF. The competition was used to determine the four CONCACAF representatives at the 2015 FIFA U-17 World Cup in Chile. The competition was hosted by Honduras.

Qualified teams

Note: no titles or runners-up between 1999 and 2007.
Bold indicates that the corresponding team was hosting the event.

Venues

New format
Previously there were four groups of three teams during the group stage of the competition, each team played a minimum of two games and the previous format had a total of 20 matches. As from 2015 there will be two groups of six teams, each team will play a minimum of five games and the competition will have a total of 33 matches. CONCACAF stated that the new format would aid development and competition.

The knockout phase, which included eight matches, consisted of four quarterfinals, two semifinals, a third-place playoff and a final, has been replaced with two playoff games and a final.

Draw
The draw took place on 8 December at the Chamber of Commerce and Industries of Cortés, Honduras.

On 2 December 2014, CONCACAF announced the procedure of the draw. The 12 teams were divided into three differing pots:

Prior to the draw, hosts Honduras were assigned to position A1. The remaining teams in Pot 1 were drawn, alternating between groups A and B. Teams were assigned a position from Pot A (Group A) or Pot B (Group B). After all teams had been drawn from Pot 1, the draw proceeded (continuing to alternate between Groups A and B) to Pot 2, then Pot 3.

Squads

Only players born on or after 1 January 1998 were eligible to play in the tournament. Each participating national association had to provide a provisional list of twenty to thirty players to CONCACAF thirty days before their first match. A final twenty-man selection had to be provided upon arrival in the venue.

Group stage

Group A

Group B

Final stage
In the final stage, if a match was level at the end of normal playing time, penalty shoot-out was used to determine the winner (no extra time was played).

Playoff stage

The second-and third-place teams from each group were re-seeded by group stage results, with the best team facing the fourth-best team, and the second-best team facing the third-best team.

Ranking of second and third-placed teams

Because all four teams finished with the same number of points and not all of them faced each other, the first playoff tiebreaker used for reseeding was goal differential in all group matches. Because two teams were tied on goal differential, the No. 3 and 4 seeds were determined based on total goals scored in the tournament. This resulted in both third-place teams being ranked ahead of both second-place teams.

Costa Rica and the United States qualified for the 2015 FIFA U-17 World Cup.

Final

Both Honduras and Mexico qualified for the 2015 FIFA U-17 World Cup.

Top goalscorers
Players with three or more goals:

6 goals
 Ronaldo Córdoba

5 goals
 Andy Reyes

4 goals
 Ronaldo Damus
 Ulises Torres
 Joe Gallardo
 Joshua Pérez

3 goals
 Duwayne Ewart
 Jostin Daly
 Nathaniel Adamolekun
 Claudio Zamudio
 Oliver Beckles

References

External links
Under 17s – Men, CONCACAF.com

 
2015
U-17
CON
International association football competitions hosted by Honduras
2015 in youth association football